San Marino debuted at the Eurovision Song Contest 2008, held in Belgrade, Serbia. The Sammarinese national broadcaster Radiotelevisione della Repubblica di San Marino (SMRTV) officially confirmed San Marino's participation in the contest in November 2007 after deliberation amongst the broadcaster's shareholders.

The pop-rock band Miodio with their Italian language song "" was selected internally by SMRTV to represent the nation. Promotion of the entry relied heavily on the internet, with a music video being created and interviews from the band to the press being published in the lead up to the Eurovision Song Contest 2008. San Marino performed fifth in the first semi-final, held on 20 May 2008, and placed last, receiving just five points.

Background

Radiotelevisione della Repubblica di San Marino (SMRTV) announced in mid November 2007 that they were considering entering the Eurovision Song Contest for the first time in 2008, pending approval from the shareholders of SMRTV. At the time, half of the stock of SMRTV belonged to Radiotelevisione Italiana (RAI), the broadcaster of Italy, which had last participated in 1997. Despite this, SMRTV received approval to take part and officially announced its participation in late November 2007. SMRTV Head of Delegation Alessandro Capicchioni stated that San Marino's motivation for entering the contest was to promote tourism and to bring attention to the nation, as "a lot of the world knows neither where San Marino is or if it even exists". For its first Eurovision appearance, SMRTV sought to host an internal selection process.

Before Eurovision

Internal selection 

SMRTV opened a submission period for interested artists and songwriters to submit their entries for the Eurovision Song Contest 2008 until 25 February. 50 songs were submitted and an expert panel consisting of Little Tony, Vince Tempera, Pasquale Panella, Michele Mangiafico, Michele Bovi, Giuseppe Cesetti, Alessandro and Marco Capicchioni and Roberto Moretti reviewed the submissions and selected San Marino's entry. Alessandro Capicchioni stated they chose an entry that would "bring Italian and Sanmarinese culture to Europe - a melodic song from our tradition". On 11 March 2008, SMRTV announced Miodio as the first Sammarinese entrant with the song "", sung in Italian. Miodio consists of Nicola Della Valle (vocals), Paolo Macina (guitar), Andrea Marco 'Polly' Pollice (bass), Francesco Sancisi (keyboard) and Alessandro Gobbi (drums). The song was written by band members Sancisi and Della Valle. Upon the announcement of their participation, the band stated that they embody "a new way of thinking, born by anger and the will to react [to what] each individual carries in their ego".

Among the submissions received by SMRTV included Italian duo Jalisse (who represented Italy in the Eurovision Song Contest 1997), Valentina Monetta, Massimo Bertacci, Michele Imberti, as well as those from different Eurovision national selections in other countries, including "If You Never Back" by Elnur Hüseynov and "We Are One" by Alexa from the Azerbaijani and Moldovan national finals, respectively.

Promotion
To promote the entry, a music video was filmed and released as part of the song's presentation on 15 March 2008. In an interview in March 2008 with ESCToday's Yiorgos Kasapoglou, Miodio stated that they were relying on the internet to get their song and name out. By May, they had performed the song live on television through Radio Television of Serbia and granted interviews to the press in the lead up to the Eurovision Song Contest 2008.

At Eurovision
The Eurovision Song Contest 2008 took place at the Belgrade Arena in Belgrade, Serbia. It consisted of two semi-finals held on 20 and 22 May, respectively, and the final on 24 May 2008.

On 28 January 2008, an allocation draw was held that placed each country into one of the two semi-finals, with San Marino being placed into the first semi-final. The 2008 contest was the first to feature two semi-finals, a change intended to reduce the problems of neighbourly and diaspora voting that occurred in years past. Countries that normally would vote for each other were placed into separate semi-finals. Once all of the competing songs for the Eurovision Song Contest had been released, the running order for the semi-finals was decided by the delegation heads of the 43 participating countries of the contest rather than through another draw; the nation was assigned position five, following  and preceding . Though only participating in the first semi-final, SMRTV aired both semi-finals and the final, which in turn allowed parts of Italy within its broadcasting area to watch the contest, despite the country itself not participating. Lia Fiorio and Gigi Restivo served as commentators for the television broadcasts, which were also streamed online, while Emilia Romagna provided commentary for Radio San Marino.

Miodio performed in the first semi-final on 20 May 2008, appearing fifth out of the 19 countries. The performance featured the band wearing black suits, but with each member wearing it in a different style. Aniko Pusztai, set designer and dancer at La Scala in Milan, joined the group on stage. SMRTV stated that they believed that choreography was as important as the song itself, deciding to use what they referred to as emotional impact for the performance. The broadcaster said that Pusztai would move on the words of the text, merging the music with dance, a sort of angel, a white that will contrast with the dark soul of Miodio. The background on the large television screens on stage was a wavy light blue colour.

Voting
Below is a breakdown of points awarded to San Marino in the first semi-final of the Eurovision Song Contest 2008, as well as by the country in the semi-final and final. Miodio's performance did not manage to inspire the crowd and San Marino only managed to receive five points with its debut entry: two points from Andorra and three points from Greece, placing the nation last of the 19 entries and not qualifying for the final. Moretti was the Sammarinese spokesperson announcing the country's voting results.

Points awarded to San Marino

Points awarded by San Marino

References

2008
Countries in the Eurovision Song Contest 2008
Eurovision